= Södertälje FC-72 =

Association football club in Södertälje, Sweden

- Full name: Södertälje Football Club-72
- Sport: soccer
- Founded: 1972
- Based in: Södertälje, Sweden

Södertälje FC-72 was a sports club in Södertälje, Sweden, established in 1972.

The women's soccer team played three seasons in the Swedish top division between 1978 and 1980.
